Eremicola is a genus of moths belonging to the family Tineidae. It contains only one species, Eremicola semitica, which is found in Palestinian Territories.

References

Tineinae
Monotypic moth genera
Moths of the Middle East